New Rockford Transcript is a local newspaper based in New Rockford, North Dakota, in the United States. In 2015, the paper's building was destroyed by fire.

References

Newspapers published in North Dakota